The 2021–22 Saint Peter's Peacocks men's basketball team represented Saint Peter's University in the 2021–22 NCAA Division I men's basketball season. The Peacocks, led by fourth-year head coach Shaheen Holloway, played their home games at the Run Baby Run Arena in Jersey City, New Jersey, as members of the Metro Atlantic Athletic Conference. They finished the season 22–12, 14–6 in MAAC play to finish in second place. They defeated Fairfield and Quinnipiac in the MAAC tournament, advancing to the championship game. There they defeated Monmouth to win the tournament championship. As a result, they received the conference's automatic bid to the NCAA tournament, for the first time since 2011, as the No. 15 seed in the East region.

The Peacocks defeated No. 2 seed Kentucky to become only the tenth No. 15 seed to upset a No. 2 seed in the Tournament's history. They defeated Murray State to advance to the Sweet Sixteen, becoming only the third No. 15 seed and first MAAC men's team to make it to the second weekend. They defeated Purdue to advance to the Elite Eight, becoming the first No. 15 seed to do so. Following the victory, the score was shown on the jumbotron of Madison Square Garden during a NHL game between the New York Rangers and Pittsburgh Penguins. In the Elite Eight, the Peacocks lost to No. 8 seed North Carolina.

On March 30, 2022, head coach and Seton Hall alum Shaheen Holloway left to take the head coaching position at his alma mater where he previously was an assistant from 2010 through 2018. On April 1, a parade was held in Jersey City to celebrate the Peacocks' tournament run. On April 5, Saint Peter's was ranked No. 24 nationally in the season's final Coaches' Poll.

Previous season
In a season limited due to the ongoing COVID-19 pandemic, the Peacocks finished the 2020–21 season 14–11, 10–8 in MAAC play to finish in a tie for third place. As the No. 3 seed in the MAAC tournament, they defeated Rider in the quarterfinals before losing to Fairfield in the semifinals.

Roster

Schedule and results

|-
!colspan=9 style=""| Exhibition

|-
!colspan=9 style=""| Regular season

|-
!colspan=9 style=""| MAAC tournament

|-
!colspan=9 style=""| NCAA tournament
 

Sources

Rankings

*Coaches did not release a week 1 poll.

References

Saint Peter's Peacocks men's basketball seasons
Saint Peter's Peacocks
Saint Peter's Peacocks basketball
Saint Peter's Peacocks basketball
Saint Peter's